Sindou is a town located in the province of Léraba in Burkina Faso. It is the capital of Léraba Province and the Sindou Department.

The region is known for the Pics de Sindou, a sharp sandstone geological formation. The town is a point of departure for visits to Mount Tenakourou, the highest peak in Burkina Faso.

References

External links
Satellite map at Maplandia.com

Populated places in the Cascades Region
Léraba Province